V803 Centauri (V803 Cen) is a cataclysmic binary consisting of a dwarf helium star losing mass to a white dwarf. It is an example of the AM Canum Venaticorum (AM CVn) type of cataclysmic variable stars.

References

Centaurus (constellation)
Dwarf novae
Centauri, V803
AM CVn stars
White dwarfs